The Nuits de Fourvière (Nights of Fourvière) is a festival with theater, circus, music, dance, and film presentations. The festival has taken place every summer since 1946 in the Théâtre antique de Fourvière, and in the Odéon de Lyon (since 1952) in the 5th arrondissement near the Basilique Notre-Dame de Fourvière.

The festival was first managed by the Charbonnières-les-Bains casino, then by the Rhône department starting in the early 1990s. Since 1 January 2005 it has been managed by Grand Lyon.

It is tradition for spectators to throw their seat cushions toward the stage at the end of the performance to show their appreciation.

Venues 
 Théâtre antique de Lyon: 2600–4400 seats depending on the configuration
 Odéon de Lyon: 900–1200 seats depending on the configuration

Attendance 
2004: 78,684
2005: 87,311
2006: 97,583
2007: 107,944
2008: 105,904
2009: 117,788
2010: 121,221
2011: 133,408
2012: 134,727
2013: 157,684
2014: 142,000
2015: 191,000
2016: 136,000

See also 

Fête des lumières
List of music festivals in France

References

External links 

 
 History and archives of the festival

Music festivals in France
Film festivals in France
Theatre festivals in France
Dance festivals in France
1946 establishments in France
5th arrondissement of Lyon
Music in Lyon